"Me Porto Bonito" (English: "I'll Behave Beautifully") is a song by Puerto Rican rapper Bad Bunny and Puerto Rican singer Chencho Corleone from the former's fifth studio album Un Verano Sin Ti (2022) featured as the fifth single, following "Callaíta", "Moscow Mule", "Tití Me Preguntó" and "Después de la Playa". The song was written by Benito Martínez and Orlando Valle but its production was handled by MAG, Subelo NEO, La Paciencia and Lennex.

Background and lyrics
During an interview with Puerto Rican personality Chente Ydrach, Bunny explained that “Me Porto Bonito” was recorded right after he attended the Met Gala in New York. He admitted to even going to the studio in his same outfit and hairdo. “When I did that song, I didn’t have anyone in mind that’s not him. If it wasn’t with him, I wasn’t going to release the song,” he expressed. The lyrics of the song features two narrators who were attracted by an attractive woman whom they convinced her to post a selfie so to demonstrate how sexy the woman is. Also, both of the men would promise to behave well to the woman if they were asked to.

Promotion and release
On May 2, 2022, Bad Bunny announced his fifth studio album, Un Verano Sin Ti, on which the song appears number three on the tracklist. On May 6, 2022, "Me Porto Bonito" was released alongside the rest of Un Verano Sin Ti through Rimas Entertainment before releasing it on June 20, 2022 as the fifth single from the album upon the release of its music video on YouTube.

Critical reception
According to the Billboard, "Me Porto Bonito" was ranked the second best collaboration song from Un Verano Sin Ti as it "transitions from its modern-day perreo to an old-school party de marquesina beat which attracts fans as their most favorite track thanks to its ultra-hyped lyrics about being beautiful and confident". The line "Tú no ere' bebecita, tú ere' bebesota" also trended as a sound on TikTok.

Awards and Nominations

Commercial performance
Following the release of its parent album, "Me Porto Bonito" debuted at number 10 on the US Billboard Hot 100 dated May 21, 2022, becoming the fourth-highest charting track from Un Verano Sin Ti behind "Moscow Mule", "Tití Me Preguntó" and "Después de la Playa", which peaked at numbers 4, 5 and 6, respectively. Additionally, it topped the US Hot Latin Songs chart as well as peaking at number 2 on the Billboard Global 200. "Me Porto Bonito" was a commercial success as it peaked at number one in Bolivia, Chile, Colombia, Ecuador, Mexico and Peru. Later, "Me Porto Bonito" would ascend to number 6 on the Billboard Hot 100 upon the issue date of July 23, 2022.

Audio visualizer
A 360° audio visualizer for the song was uploaded to YouTube on May 6, 2022, along with the other audio visualizer videos of the songs that appeared on Un Verano Sin Ti and the 360-degree video visualizer shows Bunny and two of his friends hanging out at the beach.

Music video
The music video for "Me Porto Bonito" was released on YouTube on June 20, 2022 which shows Bunny washing a pickup truck for two ladies who are making plans to go out at night, while Chencho is driving around town in a white car. The two artists then come together at a pool party where they are joined by the two ladies and a group of women. On November 20, 2022, the music video has reached 500 million views in YouTube.

Charts

Weekly charts

Year-end charts

Certifications

See also
List of Billboard Hot 100 top-ten singles in 2022
List of Billboard Hot Latin Songs and Latin Airplay number ones of 2022

References

External links
 
 
 Me Porto Bonito Lyrics

2022 songs
Bad Bunny songs
Chencho Corleone songs
Songs written by Bad Bunny